Euleia lucens is a species of fruit flies in the genus Euleia of the family Tephritidae.

References

lucens